An electric road, eroad, or electric road system (ERS) is a road which supplies electric power to vehicles travelling on it. Common implementations are overhead power lines above the road and ground-level power supply through conductive rails or inductive coils embedded in the road. Overhead power lines are limited to commercial vehicles while ground-level power can be used by any vehicle, which allows for public charging through power metering and billing systems. Of the three systems, ground-level conductive rails are estimated to be the most cost-effective. Korea was the first to implement an induction-based public electric road with a commercial bus line in 2013 after testing an experimental shuttle service in 2009. Sweden has been performing assessments of various electric road technologies since 2013 and expects to start formulating a national electric road system in 2022 and finish planning by 2033.

Technology
TRL (formerly Transport Research Laboratory) lists three power delivery types for dynamic charging, or charging while the vehicle is in motion: overhead power lines, and ground level power through rail or induction. TRL lists overhead power as the most technologically mature solution which provides the highest levels of power, but the technology is unsuitable for non-commercial vehicles. Ground-level power is suitable for all vehicles, with rail being a mature solution with high transfer of power and easily accessible and inspected elements. Inductive charging delivers the least power and requires more roadside equipment than the alternatives.

Business model
The Swedish Transport Administration anticipates that a national electric road network would require interfaces between several players: the electricity supplier, the power grid company, the vehicle manufacturer, the road owner, the electric road technology operator, the metering and billing provider, and the user of the electric road. The ownership model can vary: the power grid company may own the secondary roadside electrical substations that power the electric road infrastructure or they may be owned by other players, and the power reading and payment system may be owned by a player separate from the infrastructure operator.

History

19th and 20th century

Overhead power lines have been used for road transport since at least 1882 in Berlin with Werner von Siemens's trolley buses. Over 300 trolley bus systems were in operation in 2018. Power to trolley buses is normally delivered using a pair of trolley poles positioned on top of the vehicle which extends to the overhead power lines. Implementations for highway vehicles have been developed in the late 2000s and 2010s but they are not suitable for non-commercial vehicles such as passenger cars.

Ground-level power supply in the form of electrified rails is similar to overhead power lines in implementation. Instead of an arm or pole extending to overhead power lines, a mechanical arm extends from the bottom of the vehicle and aligns with a rail embedded in the road. The rail is then powered, and power is transferred through the arm to the vehicle. Ground-level power supply is considered aesthetically preferable to overhead wires and it is suited for all types of vehicles.

The concept of a wireless ground-level power supply for vehicles was first patented in 1894. A static-charging system for shuttle buses was demonstrated in New Zealand in 1996. Similar systems have been implemented by Conductix-Wampfler and Bombardier PRIMOVE, which were later developed from static charging at bus stations to dynamic charging while driving.

21st century
Development of electronic road systems has grown significantly from the late 1990s through the 2010s. Several companies have developed and implemented electric road systems in the 2010s.

Korea

The Korea Advanced Institute of Science and Technology launched in 2009 a shuttle service with wireless dynamic charging through inductive coils embedded in the road. In 2013 OLEV launched a bus line in the city of Gumi. Another bus line was launched in Sejong in 2015, and two more bus lines were added in Gumi in 2016.

Sweden
The Swedish Transport Administration commenced an electric road project in June 2013. The project involved pre-commercial procurement for the development of electrified roads, which is meant to generate decision data about platforms for electric roads in Sweden, and initiate the creation of a fossil-fuel free transportation infrastructure by 2030. The Swedish Transport Administration expects to finish the project's assessment phase and begin formulation of the national electric road network by 2022.

Assessment phase
A report generated by TRL in association with the Swedish Transport Administration listed available electric road systems, of which KAIST OLEV, Siemens eHighway, Elways, Elonroad, Bombardier PRIMOVE, and Electreon were found to be the most commercial-ready, with OLEV and eHighway already possessing a complete system in 2018. The project funded electric roads with overhead power lines, and ground-level conductive rails and inductive coils.

Siemens
Overhead power lines were first tested through the project, using Siemens eHighway technology. The road was opened in June 2016 in Sandviken municipality near Gävle in central Sweden. A 2-kilometre stretch of the E16 motorway was fitted with trolley wires 5.4 metres above its surface, which supply power at 750 volts DC. Trolleytrucks can connect the power pickups, mounted on mechanical arms or trolley poles, while driving under the wires. The trolley poles allow for a degree of lateral movement, but if the lorry is steered into the outside lane, the trolley poles are lowered automatically and the lorry switches to battery or diesel power. The system is capable of delivering 500 kW of power and has a maintenance period of 20 years.

Elways
Ground-level conductive rails, i.e., electric rails in the road that transmits energy to a vehicle through a conductive pickup under the vehicle, were tested from 2017 to 2019, using technology by the company Elways and a rebuilt 18-t DAF truck. A 2-kilometre stretch in one direction of road 893 between Stockholm Arlanda Airport cargo terminal and the Rosersberg logistics area 12 kilometres away was fitted with embedded conductor rails as part of the eRoadArlanda project. The project involved major international companies, small local businesses, national government agencies, local government, local property owners and academic partners. Short sections of the rails were energized when a compatible vehicle approached and disconnected once the vehicle had passed. The system measured the energy consumed, so that the vehicle owner could be billed. Buses and trucks were tested on the road, but the system could also be suited for electric cars. Safety tests were run to ensure that the rail was safe to touch even when the road was flooded with salt water. The system was capable of delivering 200 kW of power and had an expected maintenance period of 20 years.

Elonroad
Ground-level conductive rails are scheduled to begin testing in 2020 using technology by Elonroad, a Swedish startup located in Lund. The project EVolutionRoad is a three-year test and demonstration project that will run 2019–2022. The first stretch of road was inaugurated in June 2020 and is the first electric road system placed in an urban environment. A conductive pickup under the vehicle connects to the rail via sliding contacts, and the rail is only active one meter at a time when covered by the vehicle, making it safe in a city environment. The system measures the energy consumed, so that the vehicle owner can be billed. The system is capable of delivering up to 300 kW with 97% efficiency while driving.

Electreon
Ground-level inductive coils are scheduled to begin testing in 2020 using technology by Electreon, an Israeli startup. The system is similar to the eRoadArlanda project, with short sections made of copper coils that energize when a vehicle is driving over them and disconnect when it is passed that enable the use of power metering and a billing system for the energy consumed. The system is capable of delivering 50 kW of power and has a maintenance period of five years.

Cost
A 2019 report by the Swedish Electromobility Centre estimates the annualized societal costs of the entire Swedish automotive fleet under each of the three systems. Overhead power lines, despite having the most mature technology and least expensive infrastructure, are the most expensive overall because they only allow tall commercial vehicles such as trucks and buses to charge while driving, while non-commercial vehicles cannot use the wires to charge while driving, so they will have to use static charging that requires larger batteries with higher capacities than batteries required with the use of dynamic charging. Ground-level power supplies allow dynamic charging for all vehicles, which greatly reduces the required battery capacity and size since the battery is charged while it is being used. The reduced battery size and capacity reduces cost by about five billion euros annualized for the entire Swedish automotive fleet. The two types of ground-level power systems are estimated to have equal costs for all the components in aggregate other than infrastructure; the conductive rail infrastructure is estimated to cost about 1 billion euros annualized, while wireless inductive infrastructure is estimated to cost about 2.8 billion euros annualized.

Other countries
France constructed a test track for Qualcomm dynamic wireless charging of vehicles, and concluded testing in 2018. Japan tested an electric road system on a public road with Honda in 2018. Tests by various companies have been carried out in China and the United States in 2018.

India
Delhi–Mumbai Expressway is India's First Electric Highway covering 5 states in its route Haryana, Rajasthan, Madhya Pradesh, Gujarat, and Maharashtra. This highway reduces the travel time of Delhi to Mumbai from 24 hrs to 13 hrs. Electric Highway in this route helps to reduce pollution as well as crude oil imports.
The objective is to expand India's Manufacturing & Services base and develop DMIC as a "Global Manufacturing and Trading Hub". The Indian Government is planning to trial an electric highway (e-highway) on the under construction Delhi–Mumbai Expressway within the next three years to boost electric mobility in the country.

Germany
Bombardier conducted a dynamic wireless power transfer trial in Mannheim, Germany, in 2013. Germany launched an overhead power line electric road in May 2019 on a  section of Bundesautobahn 5 south of Frankfurt. The project is operated by the ELISA consortium which includes Siemens and Scania.

United Kingdom
Highways England began a dynamic wireless power transfer project in 2015 but the project was cancelled in early 2016 for budgetary reasons.

References

Road transport
Trolleybuses
Slot cars